Desirée Lois del Valle Dunham-Labrusca (born May 28, 1982), better known by her screen name Desiree del Valle, is a Filipina actress born from an Irish American father named Clois H. Dunham and a Filipino mother Lourdes del Valle from Lopez, Quezon.

She started her career and was launched in 1998 through ABS-CBN's training subsidiary, Star Magic (Batch 7).

In 2006, she transferred to GMA Network and starred as Giovanna Guillermo-Roxas in the final installment of Now and Forever but has since returned to ABS-CBN.

In 1998-2003 she had a giant impact on viewers as Corrine on Tabing Ilog a weekend tv drama that boosted the careers of many of todays stars. She would portray the role of a protagonist antagonist in the hit Primetime Drama Bituin in 2002-2003 and play the villain Francine an antagonist to Kristine Hermosa’s character in Sana’y Wala Nang Wakas (2003-2004)

Personal life
Del Valle is married to her FlordeLiza co-star Boom Labrusca since January 2018 in South Lake Tahoe, California. Del Valle confirmed their engagement on July 14, 2015. Labrusca also proposed to Del Valle again in December 2016.

Filmography

Television

Film

Awards and nominations

References

1982 births
Living people
Filipino film actresses
Filipino people of American descent
Filipino people of Irish descent
Filipino television actresses